Clear Creek is a stream in Washington County in the U.S. state of Missouri. It is a tributary of the Big River.

Clear Creek was so named on account of its clear water.

See also
List of rivers of Missouri

References

Rivers of Washington County, Missouri
Rivers of Missouri